The Miss Peru 2016 pageant was held on the night of April 23rd, 2016. This national beauty contest inaugurated the brand new Ecological Center Studios of America Television in Pachacamac, Lima, Peru, after weeks of events.

The outgoing titleholder, Laura Spoya of Lima crowned her successor, Valeria Piazza of Lima at the end of the event. 

The crowning featured the assistance of special guest Miss Universe 2015, Pia Wurtzbach of the Philippines who also judged during the final telecast.

Piazza represented Peru at Miss Universe 2016 where she successfully placed in the final. The first and second runners-up were also crowned, as Prissila Howard and Danea Panta represented Peru at the Miss Grand International 2016 and Miss International 2016 pageants, respectively.

The pageant was broadcast by America Television for the first time since 2002. The event was hosted by Miss World 2004, María Julia Mantilla and presenter Mathías Brivio.

Placements

 The (*) means that during the live telecast, there was a cut from the Top 10 to a Top 5, which followed a first final question round. Later, another cut to decide a Top 3 was decided to decide the contestants advancing to the second final question round to decide the winner. Two contestants were eliminated at that stage, and their exact placements were not specified until days later by Jessica Newton (President of the Miss Peru Organization) in an open press news release.
 The (^) means that there was supposed to be a Top 10, following the cut from the Top 15 swimsuit competition. However, it was announced by the hosts at the live telecast during the Top 10 announcement that there was a tie for 10th place, thus making it a Top 11 at the end.

Special Awards

 Best Regional Costume - San Martín - Valkiria Aragón
 Miss Photogenic - Region Lima - Ivana Yturbe
 Miss Elegance - La Esperanza - Danea Panta
 Miss Body - Amazonas - Hanny Portocarrero
 Best Hair - Cuzco - Antonella de Groot
 Miss Congeniality - Moquegua - Rossi Vargas
 Most Beautiful Face - Region Lima - Ivana Yturbe
 Best Smile -  Distrito Capital - Valeria Piazza
 Miss Rosa - Chimbote - Mirella Paz Baylón

.

Delegates

Amazonas - Hanny Portocarrero 
Áncash - Suemi Jhong
Apurímac - Flor Vergara Baca
Arequipa -  Ximena Tamayo Butilier
Ayabaca - Sophia Cossio
Callao - Giuliana Montalbetti
Chimbote - Mirella Paz Baylón
Chincha - Lucero Francis
Cuzco - Antonella De Groot Velasco
Distrito Capital - Valeria Piazza
Europe Perú - Kim Zollner
Huaraz - Stefania Viviani 
Ica - Solymar Camasca
La Esperanza - Danea Panta
La Libertad - Estefani Mauricci Gil
Lambayeque - Saymel Vega
Moquegua - Rossi Vargas
Pachacamac - Kiara Barrantes
Piura - Prissila Howard
Pucallpa - Sharon Neyra
Region Lima - Ivana Yturbe
San Isidro - Giulliana Barrios 
San Martín - Valkiria Aragón 
Sullana - Leonela López
Surco - Giomara Suárez Echegeray
Talara - Karla Flores
Trujillo - Ana Estefanía Vasquez Paiva
Tumbes - Eva Reyes
Ucayali - Marjorie Patiño
USA Peru - Janick Maceta
Villa El Salvador - Alexia Villagomez

Source:

Judges 
 Miss Universe 2015, Pia Wurtzbach from the Philippines.
 Miss Universe 1995, Chelsi Smith from the USA.
 Miss Peru 1978, Olga Zumarán.
 Miss Peru 1990, Marisol Martínez.
 Miss Peru 2001, Viviana Rivasplata.
 Miss Peru 2002, Adriana Zubiate.
 Miss Peru 2003, Claudia Ortiz de Zevallos.
 Miss World Peru 1996, Mónica Chacón.
 Miss World Peru, 2002, Marina Mora. 
 Luis Miguel Ciccia, Turismo CIVA proprietor and president of the judge panel.
 Ruth Enciso, photographer and magazine editor.
 Patricia Uehara, photographer.
 Rebecca Escribens, TV hostess and presenter.
 Norka Peralta, official gown designer of the pageant. 
 Isabel Serkovic, designer.
 Percy Luzio, TV image director.

Performers 
 Top 15 Swimsuit Competition: Lil Silvio & El Vega.
 Top 10 Evening Gown Competition: Micheille Soifer & Identico.

Contestant Notes 

 The winner, Valeria Piazza, placed in the Top 13 at Miss Universe 2016, held on January 30, 2017, at the Mall of Asia Arena in Pasay, Metro Manila, Philippines. This was Peru's 18th placement in Miss Universe history.
 The 1st runner-up, Prissila Howard, placed in the Top 10 at Miss Grand International 2016, held on  October 25, 2016, at the Westgate Las Vegas Resort & Casino in Las Vegas, NV, USA. This was Peru's 2nd placement in Miss Grand International history. Later she was appointed as Miss Universe Perú 2017 and competed in Miss Universe 2017.
The 2nd runner-up, Danea Panta, unplaced at Miss International 2016, held on October 27, 2016, at the Tokyo Dome City Hall in Tokyo, Japan. Panta had also previously won Peru's Next Top Model in 2013.
Top 11 Finalist Janick Maceta competed in Miss Perú 2019 where she placed 1st runner up and competed in Miss Supranational 2019 where she placed as 3rd runner up. A year after she competed again for the title of Miss Perú 2020 where she was crowned as the winner and represented Peru at Miss Universe 2020 competition, where she placed as 2nd runner up.

References

External links
Official Site

Miss Peru
2016 in Peru
2016 beauty pageants